The Presidium of the 20th National Congress of the Chinese Communist Party was elected by congress delegates in a preparatory meeting before the convening of the congress. The Presidium of the 20th National Congress leads the organisation and the agenda of the aforementioned congress.

The Presidium of the 20th National Congress elected at its 1st Plenary Session the Standing Committee of the Presidium of the 20th National Congress.

The preparatory session of the 20th National Congress elected Wang Huning as Secretary-General, while Ding Xuexiang, Chen Xi, Guo Shengkun and Huang Kunming as deputy secretary-generals.

Standing Committee of the Presidium

Members

See also
 20th National Congress of the Chinese Communist Party
 20th Central Committee of the Chinese Communist Party

References

20th National Congress of the Chinese Communist Party